Atriplex polycarpa, the allscale, (or all-scale) cattle spinach, allscale saltbush, or cattle saltbush, is a plant in the family Amaranthaceae.

It is native to the Southwestern United States, California, and northern Mexico.

This species blooms in July and August.

External links
Atriplex polycarpa - Calflora Gallery 
USDA Plants Profile: Atriplex polycarpa
Jepson Manual Treatment - Atriplex polycarpa

polycarpa
Flora of Arizona
Flora of Baja California
Flora of California
Flora of Nevada
Flora of Sonora
Flora of Utah
Flora of the California desert regions
Flora of the Great Basin
Flora of the Sonoran Deserts
Natural history of the Colorado Desert
Natural history of the Mojave Desert
Flora without expected TNC conservation status